Tony Mark (also known as Anthony Mark) is an American film producer, director and screenwriter. He has worked with Kathryn Bigelow and Robert Rodriguez.

Mark was a producer of And Starring Pancho Villa as Himself, which won an Imagen Award in 2004 as "Best Movie for Television".

Biography

Early life
Mark worked at WEOK-FM as a disc jockey for a late-night jazz/blues program. He worked for Wakeford-Orloff and Dick Miller Associates, where he made television commercials for Coca-Cola, GE, IBM, Texaco and others.

Selected filmography

As Producer
The Hurt Locker (2009)
Georgia O'Keeffe (2009)
Fire Bay (2008)
Bordertown (2007) (co-producer)
Ultraviolet (2006) (executive producer)
Once Upon a Time in Mexico (2003) (co-producer)
Scary Movie 2 (2001) (co-executive producer)
Jackie Bouvier Kennedy Onassis (2000) (TV) (producer)
8 Seconds (1994) (co-producer)
The Fisher King (1991) (associate producer) (as Anthony Mark)
Zelly and Me (1988) (producer)
Billy Galvin (1986) (producer)

As Production Manager
The Hurt Locker (2009)
Bordertown (2006) (unit production manager)
Scary Movie 2 (2001) (unit production manager)
The Wedding Planner (2001) (unit production manager)
Jackie Bouvier Kennedy Onassis (2000) (TV) (unit production manager)
The Mirror Has Two Faces (1996) (unit production manager)
Desperado (1995) (unit production manager)
8 Seconds (1994) (unit production manager)
Nowhere to Run (1993) (unit production manager)
The Fisher King (1991) (unit production manager) (as Anthony Mark)

As Second Unit Director
Scary Movie 2 (2001) (second unit director)
Jackie Bouvier Kennedy Onassis (2000) (TV) (second unit director: New York/Canada)
Earthly Possessions (1999) (TV) (second unit director)

Awards and honors
The Hurt Locker (2009) – Venice Film Festival – SIGNIS Grand Prize – Best Film
The Hurt Locker (2009) – Venice Film Festival – Human Rights Film Network Award – Best Film
The Hurt Locker (2009) – Venice Film Festival – Arca Young Cinema Award – Best Film Venezia 65
The Hurt Locker (2009) – Venice Film Festival – Sergio Trasatti Award – Best Film
And Starring Pancho Villa as Himself (2003) (TV) – Emmy Nomination "Outstanding Made for Television Movie"
The Fisher King (1991) – 5 Oscar nominations, 1 win ("best actress" Mercedes Ruehl),
The Fisher King (1991) – Won 3 Golden Globes (Jeff Bridges, Mercedes Ruehl, and Robin Williams), nominated for best director and best motion picture

References

American film producers
Carnegie Mellon University alumni
American Jews
Living people
Film directors from New York City
People from Tesuque, New Mexico
Film directors from New Mexico
Year of birth missing (living people)